Barbara Moraff (born 1939 Paterson, New Jersey) is an American poet of the Beat generation living in Vermont. She continues to write, and also creates pottery and cooks.

Life
Jack Kerouac called Moraff "the baby of the Beat generation"  because she was just 18 when they met but was already being published by Leroi Jones and in Evergreen Review. She was reading in various New York City coffeehouses when she was able to get out of a very restrictive home environment—complicated by plastic surgery needed to repair her face after a mutilation. In a 1964 interview with Paideuma (University of Maine), Kerouac called Moraff "the best girl poet writing in America". "

Moraff and her lover moved to Vermont in late 1961, where they built a small one-room cabin on land belonging to a former Black Mountain College student with whom they exchanged work for rent. At that time Moraff was experimenting writing SOUND poetry.  Robert Duncan sent a poem by her to Denise Levertov.

Moraff's first child, Alesia, was born in 1966, and shortly afterward Moraff bought a remote hilltop farm in Strafford, Vermont. She taught herself organic farming practices and for many years raised the family's food and kept a cow and two goats. She made cheese and studied medicinal herbs. Her son Marco was born in 1971. In 1972 he was diagnosed with cystic fibrosis.

In 1973, Moraff founded Vermont Artisans, Vermont's first craft sales and educational cooperative.  She studied human nutrition and after 3 years of research devised a nutritional plan for Marco, which resulted in the writing of The Cookbook/Handbook to Nutrition for Kids Who Have Cystic Fibrosis. It was considered crazy to even discuss nutritional problems, let alone write a cookbook for children who required enzymes at every meal in order to metabolize food nutrients. Moraff self-published the book; it can be found in the CF Foundation's library, and is used by physicians who agree with her commonsense approach of telling one's child that it is his/her body that is ill, not the child-as-person.

Marco grew healthy and ran long-distance track in high school.  He became an artist, and many of his works are now in private collections.  He also designed and built furniture using driftwood, branchwood, marble, and slate. He died in April 2007 as a result of his cystic fibrosis.

Moraff met Chogyam Trungpa in 1974 through Allen Ginsberg.  She thought she could learn Tibetan Buddhist breathing methods to help Marco develop lungs strong enough to resist the early ravages of CF.

Moraff continued her Buddhist practice and study, attending the last seminary at which Trungpa was present, and later, ngedon school.

Moraff began writing poetry again in 1976 when asked by a feminist lesbian press to sit on its editorial board. There she edited the magazine CONCH and co-edited an anthology of local women's writings and art.  This included the first published work of Louise Erdrich.

In 2007, Moraff was editing and collating a collection of previously published and unpublished work and was also working on a new collection (tentative title Machig Labdron Songs). Forthcoming in late spring 2007 is a booklet from Longhouse Publishers, FOOTPRINT.

Although partially disabled, Moraff is still able to produce some pottery, mostly commissioned dinner sets.  In the summer, she bakes wholegrain sourdough bread and sells it at local farmers' markets.

Publishers
Moraff's publishers: Toothpaste Press, Potes & Poets Press, Longhouse, Coffeehouse Press, White Pine Press, O'Leary Family, Nomad London, Totem-Corinth (4 Young Lady Poets), Snakestail/High risk (A Different Beat), and the usual "many magazines & journals" & anthologies including Evergreen Review, Yögen, Trobar, Kauri, Femora, Fuckyou, Beatitude, Bluebeat, Beat Scene, The Nation, Yale Penny Poems, Virginia Quarterly, Origin, Longhouse, Wormwood Review, Rosebud, Cedar Rock, Plucked Chicken, Wildflower, Van Gogh's Ear, Valley News, L.A. Weekly, Vajradhaty Sun, Sulfur, Cipher Journal, Abraxas, Bloodroot, et. Moraff also appears in two movies: an anti-war film Button, Button (aired on CBS) and Enlightened Society (Vajradhatu Films).

Works

Poetry
 (Morning Coffee Chapbook),
 (Scout)Open to the OtherLotus PetalsAhh'', Shadowplay, 1992

Anthologies

References

Beat Generation writers
1939 births
Living people
Writers from Paterson, New Jersey
American women poets
21st-century American women